Marc Culetto (born 29 August 1956) is a French former professional footballer who played as a defender. As of the 2021–22 season, he is the head coach of US Brioude's reserve side and an assistant coach for the club's first team. He also works as the first team's sporting director.

Honours 
Monaco

 Division 2: 1976–77 Group A
 Coupe de France: 1979–80

Notes

References 

1956 births
Living people
Sportspeople from Haute-Loire
French footballers
Association football defenders
INF Vichy players
AS Monaco FC players
AS Béziers Hérault (football) players
French Division 3 (1971–1993) players
Ligue 2 players
Ligue 1 players
Division d'Honneur players

Association football coaches
French football managers
Footballers from Auvergne-Rhône-Alpes